3,4-Methylenedioxyphentermine (MDPH) is a lesser-known psychedelic drug. MDPH was first synthesized by Alexander Shulgin. In his book PiHKAL (Phenethylamines i Have Known And Loved), the dosage range is listed as 160–240 mg, and the duration as 3–5 hours. MDPH's effects are very similar to those of MDA: they both are smooth and "stoning," and do not cause any visuals.  They also alter dreams and dream patterns.  Shulgin describes MDPH as a promoter; it promotes the effects of other drugs, similarly to 2C-D. Very little data exists about the pharmacological properties, metabolism, and toxicity of MDPH.

Legality

United Kingdom
This substance is a Class A drug in the Drugs controlled by the UK Misuse of Drugs Act.

See also
 3,4-Dichloroamphetamine
 Cericlamine
 Chlorphentermine
 Cloforex
 Clortermine
 Etolorex
 Phentermine

References 

Substituted amphetamines
Entactogens and empathogens
Benzodioxoles
Monoamine releasing agents